St. Nicholas Diocesan School is a diocesan Anglican school, located in Pietermaritzburg, Kwa-Zulu Natal, South Africa. St. Nicholas is an independent school catering for boys and girls in Grades RR to 12, and is a member of the Independent Schools Association of Southern Africa.

Notable alumni
Ntokozo Dlamini - actor

References

External links

Private schools in KwaZulu-Natal
Pietermaritzburg